The Auburn–Florida football rivalry is an American college football rivalry between the Auburn Tigers football team of Auburn University and Florida Gators football team of the University of Florida which was first played in 1912. The schools have been members of the same athletic conference for over a century and were founding members of the Southeastern Conference (SEC) when it was established in 1933. The contest was an annual tradition from 1945 until 2002, when the SEC expanded and the rivalry became part of a rotation of other conference games. Since then, the teams have met only four times.

The rivalry has been closely contested, both as a series and in individual games, with thirty-three of the contests decided by a touchdown or less, including two ties. And though both the Gators and Tigers have each enjoyed occasional win streaks over the years, the overall tally is close, with Auburn holding a 43-39-2 edge as of the most recent meeting in 2019. It has also seen many upsets, particularly by Auburn. Lower ranked Tiger squads have beaten top-10 Gator teams on seven occasions over the course of the rivalry, including twice when Florida was ranked #1.

Series history 

While the early part of the series saw Auburn and Florida trade 6-game and 5-game winning streaks respectively, the rivalry has evolved into one of the mostly evenly matched and hardest fought in the Southeastern Conference.  The games have often had SEC title and national championship implications.  As described by Gainesville Sun sports columnist Pat Dooley following the 2007 game, "Florida-Auburn delivered another game that made one side ecstatic and one side heartbroken.  That's what it does."

The first game in the series was played between coach Mike Donahue's Tigers and coach George E. Pyle's Gators in 1912, on the Auburn, Alabama campus of what was then called Alabama Polytechnic Institute.  The Auburn Tigers won the first six games played by the two teams from 1912 to 1917, dominating the Florida Gators by two or more touchdowns in five of the six games.  When the series resumed in 1927, the Florida Gators were experiencing revived success under coaches Harold Sebring and Charlie Bachman, and it was the Gators' turn for a streak, winning seven of the next eight.  Beginning in 1935, the fortunes of the Gators and Tigers reversed again, with the Tigers compiling a 7–2–1 record in the next ten games played through 1947.

The Auburn–Florida game has not always been played on the universities' respective campuses in Auburn, Alabama and Gainesville, Florida.  In the early years of the series, six games were played in Fairfield Stadium in Jacksonville, Florida, five matches at the Cramton Bowl in Montgomery, Alabama, and one each in Miami, Florida; Columbus, Georgia; Tampa, Florida; and Mobile, Alabama.  Starting in 1950, every regular game has been played at either Jordan–Hare Stadium (previously known as Auburn Stadium and Cliff Hare Stadium) in Auburn, or Ben Hill Griffin Stadium (also known as Florida Field) in Gainesville.  For the only time in the series history, the Gators and Tigers met for a second time during the same season in the 2000 SEC Championship Game held at the Georgia Dome in Atlanta, Georgia with Florida following up their regular season victory with a second one to claim the conference championship.

With the construction of Auburn Stadium in 1939, the Tigers started a remarkable 32-year streak on the Tigers' home field during which they would tie the Gators once and defeat them twelve consecutive times.  The Gators broke the Tigers' home-field winning streak in a hard-fought upset in 1973.

From 1945 to 2002, the Florida Gators and Auburn Tigers played 58 consecutive annual games; The Gators and Tigers have played 82 games in the past 99 years, and the current all-time series record is forty-two victories for the Tigers, thirty-eight for the Gators, and two ties.  The Tigers hold a 21−7−1 edge in games played in their current stadium; the Gators have a 22−9 advantage in games played on their present field.

Arkansas and South Carolina joined the SEC in 1991, and the conference was split into two six-team divisions in 1992.  Since then, Florida has been a member of the SEC East Division, and Auburn has been a member of the SEC West Division.  At first, every SEC team played an annual game against two permanent rivals in the other division and a third cross-divisional game that rotated among the other four teams in that division.  Auburn's original two cross-division rivals were Georgia and Florida; Florida's were LSU and Auburn.  In 2002, the SEC changed the cross-division format to one permanent rival and two rotating teams.  Since Auburn's rivalry with Georgia was older and more notable, Georgia remained Auburn's lone cross-division rival while Florida retained their annual game against LSU, and the previously annual Auburn–Florida football rivalry became an intermittent one.  From 2003-2011, the teams were scheduled to play two games every five-year cycle.  In 2012, the SEC added Missouri and Texas A&M, but kept the football schedule at eight games per season.  As a result, Auburn and Florida now play only two games per 12-year cycle.

Game results

Notable games 

Most great rivalries are marked by frequent close games, unexpected upsets, and memorable moments; the evenly matched Auburn–Florida rivalry has provided many.  Thirty-three of the eighty-two games in the series have been decided by seven points or fewer.  Among SEC rivalries, the Auburn–Florida series (43–39–2) is the third-most evenly matched after the Georgia-Auburn series (55–55–8) and the Florida–Tennessee series (26–19).  Auburn has won two national football championships, and seven SEC championships; Florida has won three national championships, and eight SEC championships.  In terms of all-time winning percentage, less than half a percentage point separates the Tigers (.634) and the Gators (.631).  Several of the most notable games in the 99-year history of the rivalry are described below.

1939: Auburn's new stadium 

In the first varsity football game played at the Tigers' new Auburn Stadium, coach Josh Cody's 1939 Gators and coach Jack Meagher's Tigers played to a 7–7 tie.  In the second quarter, Florida fullback Charlie Tate scored the only touchdown of the day for the Gators, then kicked the extra point; Tigers back Dick McGowen threw a touchdown pass to end Babe McGehee to tie the game in the fourth quarter. The meeting ended in controversy when an official miscommunicated the amount of time remaining in the game to Auburn quarterback Lloyd Cheatham, who was under the impression the Tigers had two minutes (rather than two seconds) left to score; at the time, Auburn had the ball on Florida's two-yard line. After the 1939 dedication of Auburn Stadium, the Gators would not win (or tie) a game on the Auburn campus for another thirty-four years.

1957: First meeting of ranked teams 

When coach Bob Woodruff's nineteenth-ranked 1957 Florida Gators and coach Shug Jordan's Auburn Tigers met in Cliff Hare Stadium in Auburn, it was the first game between the rivals in which both teams were ranked in the top twenty of the AP Poll.  Woodruff's Gators featured their usual strong defense, but the Tigers defense was even better and held the Gators scoreless in their 13–0 victory.  At the end of the season, the Gators finished in the top twenty of the final AP Poll for only the second time in their history, as the Tigers earned the 1957 AP Poll national championship.

1958: Baseball score? 

Coach Bob Woodruff's Gators and coach Shug Jordan's Tigers played nine games against each other between 1951 and 1959, only three of which were decided by more than ten points.  However, none was closer than the game between the unranked 1958 Florida Gators and the defending national champions and fourth-ranked Auburn Tigers, a game in which neither team scored more than six points. Late in the fourth quarter, with the Tigers leading 6–3 on the strength of a single touchdown and a missed extra point, the stingy Gators defense pinned the Tigers offense behind their own three-yard-line. Rather than risk a turnover, Jordan ordered Tigers quarterback Johnny Kern to kneel in their own end zone, intentionally scoring a safety for the Gators, but earning a free punt for the Tigers. The Tigers kicked it away, and their defense held on to win 6–5.

1962: Florida upsets No. 10 Auburn
Auburn came to Gainesville ranked #10 in the AP Poll and 5-0 on the season to face the struggling Gators, who entered the contest at 3-3. However, the Tigers ran into an ambush as the underdog Gators intercepted two passes, and recovered three fumbles en route to a 22-3 win.

1966: Heisman Trophy field goal 

Coach Ray Graves' 1966 Florida Gators and coach Shug Jordan's Auburn Tigers repeatedly traded the lead as they battled back and forth all day.  In the fourth quarter with the game tied at 27, Gators quarterback Steve Spurrier was engineering a late drive for the win, but was stopped at Auburn's 39-yard-line following an intentional grounding penalty.  The distance was outside the usual range of the Gators regular placekicker, but Spurrier had kicked 40-yard field goals in practice. With 2:12 left in the game, he kicked the 40-yard field goal to give the Gators a 30–27 lead, and the Gators defense held on to win.  He completed twenty-seven passes on forty attempts for 259 yards, one touchdown pass and no interceptions, and also rushed for a touchdown.  Another Gators standout, tailback Larry Smith, finished the day with 102 rushing yards and a touchdown on twenty-two carries, including a 53-yard run.  At the conclusion of the 1966 season, Spurrier was awarded the Heisman Trophy.

1973: Breaking the Auburn jinx 

Led by first-time starting quarterback Don Gaffney, the 1973 Gators finally broke the Tigers; home-field winning streak after thirty-four years.  Gators linebacker Ralph Ortega tackled Tigers tailback Chris Linderman inside the Gators' five yard-line and forced a fumble shortly before halftime.  Gators linebacker Sammy Green forced a critical fumble by Auburn Tigers tailback Sullivan Walker, which led to a touchdown and the Gators' margin of victory in a 12–8 upset of the Tigers at home to give the Gators their first-ever win at Jordan–Hare Stadium.  Auburn scored its only points in the final play of the game. After the game, Gators players carried head coach Doug Dickey from the field, and Gators athletic director Ray Graves described the victory as "one of the greatest moments in University of Florida football history."

1976: 'Attack' of the War Eagle 

Coach Doug Dickey's 1976 Gators and coach Doug Barfield's Tigers played a strong defensive game, with the Gators' winning margin coming on two pass plays—with some help from Auburn's mascot.  The decisive score came late in the game when Gators quarterback Jimmy Fisher tossed a short pass to wide receiver Wes Chandler, who caught it, reversed direction twice, and weaved his way through the entire Auburn defense for a 64-yard touchdown reception and run.  After Chandler ran out of the end zone, Auburn's War Eagle, Tiger, jumped off its perch to avoid a collision, her talons grazing Chandler's shoulder pads, an encounter Chandler later described as an attack. For decades, a coincidental 15-yard penalty assessed on the ensuing kickoff against Auburn for a late hit on Chandler has been mistakenly reported as an infraction stemming from interference by a mascot.  Florida won 24−19.

1982: Gainey wins for Gators
Auburn led 17–13 with 2:51 remaining in the game. Jim Gainey's field goal cut it to one, and after an onside kick, Gainey added another for the win.

1985: Bo knows defense 

Coach Galen Hall's second-ranked 1985 Florida Gators were on NCAA probation when they met coach Pat Dye's sixth-ranked Auburn Tigers at Jordan−Hare Stadium.  Tigers tailback Bo Jackson started the game as the leading contender to win the Heisman Trophy.  But Jackson's Heisman hopes took a serious blow when he ran into a ferocious Gators defense that held him to just forty-seven yards rushing, and the Gators stuffed the Tigers 14–10 in yet another defensive struggle.  On the strength of the win over the Tigers, the Gators vaulted into the No. 1 spot in the AP Poll for the first time in school history.  Notwithstanding the Tigers' loss to the Gators, Jackson won the Heisman at the conclusion of the 1985 season.

1986: Bell leads fourth-quarter comeback 

For most of the game, coach Pat Dye's fifth-ranked 1986 Auburn Tigers dominated coach Galen Hall's unranked Florida Gators at Florida Field.  The Tigers defense was stifling, and forced Gators substitute quarterback Rodney Brewer to commit four turnovers in the first two quarters.  Hall replaced Brewer with starting quarterback Kerwin Bell, who had missed two games with a knee injury. Tigers tailback Brent Fullwood gained 166 yards on the ground, including a second-quarter touchdown, to give Auburn a 17–0 lead early in the fourth quarter.  Bell then led the Gators on two scoring drives, with Gators placekicker Robert McGinty—a transfer from Auburn—booting a 51-yard field goal to close the Tigers' advantage to 17−10 with 7:10 to play.  After Webbie Burnett recovered a fumble at the Florida 34 with 1:41 remaining in the game, Bell directed one final drive that was capped by a five-yard touchdown pass with 0:36 remaining to wide receiver Ricky Nattiel, who was playing with a separated shoulder. The limping Bell then surprised the Tigers defense by running in the two-point conversion and completing the comeback, with the Gators winning 18–17.

1990: Spurrier's offense makes a statement 

Coach Pat Dye's 1990 Auburn Tigers were the defending three-time SEC champions, had built an undefeated 6−0−1 record, and were ranked fourth in the nation in the AP Poll.  Notwithstanding the fact that first-year coach Steve Spurrier's fifteenth-ranked Florida Gators were three-point favorites, Dye had been publicly dismissive of Spurrier's pass-oriented offense before the game.  The Gators and Tigers were tied 7–7 after the first quarter, but Spurrier's Gators exploded for twenty-seven points in the second quarter, resulting in a 34–7 halftime lead and a 48–7 victory for the Gators, which was the Gators' biggest margin of victory in the series, and the worst loss of Dye's career.

1993: Auburn upsets No. 4 Florida 

On a cold, drizzling, dreary day in Auburn, coach Steve Spurrier's fourth-ranked 1993 Gators amassed 560 yards of total offense, including 386 yards passing by quarterback Danny Wuerffel and 196 yards rushing by tailback Errict Rhett.  But the Gators' offensive fireworks were not enough for the win, as Auburn's defense sacked Wuerffel four times and made two key interceptions.  The two teams were tied at 35 with 1:21 left in the game, when Tigers placekicker Scott Etheridge booted a 41-yard field to beat the Gators, 38–35.

1994: Auburn upsets No. 1 Florida 

Coach Terry Bowden's sixth-ranked 1994 Auburn Tigers entered the Swamp as 17-point underdogs to coach Steve Spurrier's top-ranked Florida Gators, but, just like the year before, the Tigers offense kept pace with the Gators as its defense forced key turnovers by the Gators.  The Gators' starting quarterback, Terry Dean, threw four interceptions in the first half, and was replaced by Danny Wuerffel, who threw three touchdown passes but was intercepted by Tigers defensive back Brian Robinson with 1:20 left.  Tigers quarterback Patrick Nix engineered a quick drive, and threw an eight-yard touchdown pass to Frank Sanders, winning the game for Auburn, 36–33.

2000: SEC Championship Game 

Florida defeated Auburn in the 2000 regular season in Gainesville 38-7.  For the first time in series history, both teams would meet for the second time in a season in the SEC Championship game in Atlanta, GA.  Florida defeated Auburn in similar fashion, 28-6, to claim the SEC Championship.

2001: Auburn upsets No. 1 Florida again 

Coach Tommy Tuberville's unranked 2001 Auburn Tigers were 21-point underdogs when they met coach Steve Spurrier's No. 1 Florida Gators at Jordan–Hare Stadium.  Gators quarterback Rex Grossman completed twenty-five of forty-two passes for 364 yards and two touchdowns, but also threw four interceptions.  The Gators dominated statistically, but the Tigers' bend-but-don't-break defense held the Gators rushing game to negative yardage.  Tigers back-up quarterback Daniel Cobb was not so flashy, but played mistake-free football, and the game was tied at 20 late in the fourth quarter.  With 10 seconds left, Tigers placekicker Damon Duval nailed a 44-yard field goal and the Tigers upset the top-ranked Gators 23–20.

2002: Not in our house 

First-year coach Ron Zook led his unranked Florida Gators against coach Tommy Tuberville's Auburn Tigers in Gainesville.  Rex Grossman quarterbacked the Gators to a pair of early scores, and Florida led 23–7.  The Tigers' starting tailback, Carnell Williams, left the game with a broken leg, but backup Ronnie Brown amassed 162 yards and three touchdowns, as the Tigers came roaring back to tie the score at 23 in the fourth quarter.  With one final chance to win the game in regulation, Tigers placekicker Damon Duval lined up for the game-winning kick as he had in 2001, but Gators defensive end Bobby McCray blocked the kick as time expired.  In overtime, Grossman threw a 25-yard touchdown pass to receiver Taylor Jacobs, the Gators defense held the Tigers on downs, and Florida won 30–23.

2006: Auburn upsets No. 2 Florida 
In a battle of top-15 teams, the #2 Florida Gators faced off against the #11 Auburn Tigers in the plains. Florida jumped out to a 17–8 lead midway through the second quarter on Gators freshman backup quarterback Tim Tebow's rushing touchdown, but settled for a slim 17–11 halftime lead. In the second half, however, Auburn returned a blocked Florida punt for a touchdown to give the Tigers their first lead of the game, 18–17. The momentum suddenly shifted in Auburn's favor, shutting out the Gators the rest of the way and recovering two Florida fumbles, one of which was returned a touchdown as time expired, to cap off the 27–17 upset. This was Florida's only loss that season, as the Gators would go on to win the BCS National Championship.

2007: Auburn upsets No. 4 Florida again 

Coach Urban Meyer's fourth-ranked 2007 Florida Gators played host to coach Tommy Tuberville's unranked Auburn Tigers.  Tigers quarterback Brandon Cox led the Tigers to an early 17–3 lead, but Gators quarterback (and eventual Heisman Trophy winner) Tim Tebow and all-purpose back and receiver Percy Harvin led a comeback to tie it at 17.  The Tigers had one chance to win in regulation, as kicker Wes Byrum attempted a potentially game winning 45-yard field goal with four seconds left and nailed it.  But Meyer had called a timeout at the last possible moment to ice the kicker before the snap had taken place. So, after the timeout, Byrum had to try it again.  After successfully making the field goal again as time expired to upset Florida 20–17, he taunted the Florida head coach and crowd with a few mock Gator chomps.

See also 

 List of NCAA college football rivalry games

References

Bibliography 

 2009 Southern Conference Football Media Guide,  Year-by-Year Standings, Southern Conference, Spartanburg, South Carolina, pp. 74−77(2009).
 2010 Southeastern Conference Football Media Guide, Southeastern Conference, Birmingham, Alabama, p. 60 (2010).
  2011 Auburn Tigers Football Media Guide , Auburn University Athletic Department, Auburn, Alabama, pp. 178−189, 191 (2011).
  2011 Florida Gators Football Media Guide, University Athletic Association, Gainesville, Florida, pp. 116−125 (2011).
 Carlson, Norm, University of Florida Football Vault: The History of the Florida Gators, Whitman Publishing, LLC, Atlanta, Georgia (2007).  .
 Golenbock, Peter, Go Gators!  An Oral History of Florida's Pursuit of Gridiron Glory, Legends Publishing, LLC, St. Petersburg, Florida (2002).  .
 Hairston, Jack, Tales from the Gator Swamp: A Collection of the Greatest Gator Stories Ever Told, Sports Publishing, LLC, Champaign, Illinois (2002).  .
 Housel, David, Auburn University Football Vault: The Story of the Auburn Tigers, 1892−2007, Whitman Publishing, LLC, Atlanta, Georgia (2007).  .
 McCarthy, Kevin M.,  Fightin' Gators: A History of University of Florida Football, Arcadia Publishing, Mount Pleasant, South Carolina (2000).  .
 McEwen, Tom, The Gators: A Story of Florida Football, The Strode Publishers, Huntsville, Alabama (1974).  .
 Nash, Noel, ed., The Gainesville Sun Presents The Greatest Moments in Florida Gators Football, Sports Publishing, Inc., Champaign, Illinois (1998).  .
 Proctor, Samuel, & Wright Langley, Gator History: A Pictorial History of the University of Florida, South Star Publishing Company, Gainesville, Florida (1986).  .
 Saylor, Roger, " Southern Intercollegiate Athletic Association ," College Football Historical Society, The LA84 Foundation (1993).

College football rivalries in the United States
Auburn Tigers football
Florida Gators football